Zaviyeh Hajian (also Romanized as Zāvīyeh Ḩājīān and Zāveyeh Ḩājeyān; also known as Konārī) is a village in Qeblehi Rural District, in the Central District of Dezful County, Khuzestan Province, Iran. At the 2006 census, its population was 295, in 57 families.

References 

Populated places in Dezful County